HMS Bristol was the name ship of her class of wooden screw frigates built for the Royal Navy during the 1860s.

Design and description
The ship's tonnage was 3,027  tons burthen and Bristol displaced . The ship had a crew of 550 officers and ratings.

She had a horizontal, two-cylinder, single-expansion steam engine, built by Robert Napier and Sons, that drove a single propeller shaft using steam that was provided by four boilers. The engine produced  which gave the ship a maximum speed of  under steam. To improve her sailing qualities, the propeller could be hoisted into the hull.

Bristol was initially equipped with thirty ML eight-inch (203 mm) smoothbore muzzle-loading guns (SBML) of 65 hundredweight on her gundeck. These guns were designed specifically to fire the latest exploding shells, unlike the traditional solid cannonballs. On her upper deck were twenty 32-pounder SBML guns that weighed 56 hundredweight and a single 68-pounder SBML gun on a pivot mount. In January 1868, the ship was rearmed with 10 eight-inch shell guns and a dozen rifled, muzzle-loading 64-pounder guns on the gundeck. Four more 64-pounders were mounted on the upper deck.

'An analysis of ship air and its effect' was made and reported during a four months' voyage (July to November 1871) from the Cape of Good Hope to England. This gives an insite to the conditions on board and concludes 'Seamen, as a body, are neither healthy nor long lived, but the reverse. This is proved, first, by their low average age, said to be 33'. A description of the ship layout is also given, the upper tier contained the Main deck, Upper, Half deck, Study, Mess room & Main deck cabins. Middle tier contained the Lower deck, Steerage, Ward room, Chest (cadets' sleeping) room and steerage cabins Do., & Pantry. The Lowest tier Stokehole, Engine room, Screw alley, Cockpit, Store room & Cells. It also states the ship had four boilers.

Construction and career

Bristol, named after the city of Bristol, was ordered on 9 April 1856 as part of the 1856 Naval Programme. As the design was revised several times, she was not laid down at Woolwich Dockyard until 16 September 1859. The ship was launched on 12 February 1861, but she was not commissioned until October 1865. On 10 November, she ran aground off the Nore during her sea trials. She was refloated and sailed for Portsmouth, Hampshire. On 11 December 1869, she ran aground. Repairs cost £2,197. Her pilot was found at fault, and was stripped of his licence to pilot men-of-war.

References

Notes 

Frigates of the Royal Navy
Ships built in Woolwich
Victorian-era frigates of the United Kingdom
1861 ships
Maritime incidents in November 1865
Maritime incidents in December 1869